For the rapper with the same birth name, see V.I.C.

Victor Owusu (26 December 1923 – 16 December 2000) was a Ghanaian politician and lawyer. He has also served as Attorney General and Justice minister as well as foreign minister on two occasions. He was the Leader of the Opposition in the Third Republic from 1979 to 1981.

Early life
Owusu was born on 26 December 1923 in Agona, Ashanti Region. Owusu was an economist who later trained as a lawyer. He was a prominent member of the National Liberation Movement which stood for the 1956 elections in the Gold Coast prior to elections. During the First Republic, he was detained under the Preventive Detention Act (1958) by the Kwame Nkrumah government. He was released after the 24 February 1966 coup d'état that brought in the military National Liberation Council (NLC) government. He was appointed Attorney General and Minister for Justice by the NLC.

Education
Victor Owusu attended Achimota School between 1937 and 1945. There, his contemporaries included K. B. Asante and Joe Reindorf. He proceeded to the United Kingdom in 1946 to study Economics at the University of Nottingham and later studied law at the University of London. He was called to the bar at Lincoln's Inn in 1952.

In Government
He was a member of the Progress Party that won the 1969 elections. Kofi Abrefa Busia appointed him foreign minister twice in the Second Republic. The first time was in 1969 and the second was between 1969 and 1971. On both occasions, he took over the portfolio from Patrick Dankwa Anin, who also served twice. The Second Republic came to an end with the 13 January 1972 coup led by General (then Colonel) I. K. Acheampong.

Leader of the opposition
Owusu was a founding member and leader of the Popular Front Party in the Third Republic. He was the runner-up to Dr. Hilla Limann of the People's National Party (PNP) in the 1979 Ghanaian presidential elections with 38% of the votes after the second round of voting. After the election, the PFP merged with other opposition parties to form the All People's Party (AFP) under Owusu's  leadership. The AFP, along with other political parties, were banned after the 31 December 1981 coup by the Provisional National Defence Council led by Flt. Lt. Jerry Rawlings.

Later life
From 1991 until his death, Victor Owusu lived in Putney, London, United Kingdom. He died in London on 16 December 2000. He was married to Agnes Owusu.

Trivia
John Kufuor, president of Ghana, said he had practised as a junior in Victor Owusu's law firm.
He was an uncle of Dr Charles Wereko-Brobby and a maternal half-brother to Kobina Annan, a retired diplomat who is also a paternal half-brother to Kofi Annan.

See also
Attorney General of Ghana
Minister for Foreign Affairs (Ghana)

References

1923 births
2000 deaths
20th-century Ghanaian lawyers
Foreign ministers of Ghana
Ghanaian Freemasons
Ghanaian MPs 1956–1965
Ghanaian MPs 1969–1972
National Liberation Movement (Ghana) politicians
Popular Front Party politicians
Alumni of Achimota School
Candidates for President of Ghana
Attorneys General of Ghana
People from Ashanti Region
Ghanaian expatriates in the United Kingdom